The Patan Museum(Nepali: पाटन संग्रहालय) is a museum located in Patan, Lalitpur, Nepal. The museum falls under the UNESCO's World Heritage Sites. The Patan Museum was inaugurated in 1997 by Late King Birendra Bir Bikram Shah. The Patan Museum displays the traditional sacred arts of Nepal in an illustrious architectural setting. Its home is an old residential court of Patan Durbar, one of the royal palaces of former Malla Kings of the Kathmandu Valley. The royal palace was built in 1734, on the site of a Buddhist monastery. The museum quadrangle is known as Keshav Narayan Chowk.

Present 
Patan Durbar Square was heavily damaged by the earthquake in April 2015.

Former International Artists in Residence include Nancy Condon, Jessica Melville-Brown, and Joy Lynn Davis.

The current chairman of the Board of Directors is Kedar Bahadur Adhikari, from the Ministry of Culture, Tourism and Civil Aviation, Singh Durbar, Kathmandu.

The entrance fees are 1000 Nepalese rupees for foreign visitors, 250 for SAARC visitors, 30 for Nepali visitors, and 15 for Nepalese students (with identification).

Collection

The Patan Museum's mission is "the interpretation of Sacred Art, Culture and Iconography of Hinduism and Buddhism  through preservation and exhibition."

The museum's exhibits cover a long span of Nepal's cultural history. It has over 1,100 artifacts, about 200 of which are on permanent display.

Most of the objects are cast bronzes (mostly sculptures of Hindu and Buddhist deities) and gilt copper repoussé work, traditional crafts for which Patan is famous.

Gallery

See also 
 List of museums in Nepal
 National Museum of Nepal
 Taragaon Museum

Notes

References

External links 

 Patan Museum Official Website
 Asian antiques and Arts of Asia: Patan Museum

Museums in Nepal
Patan Durbar Square
1997 establishments in Nepal